The 2017 Svijany Open was a professional tennis tournament played on clay courts. It was the 5th edition of the tournament which was part of the 2017 ATP Challenger Tour. It took place in Liberec, Czech Republic between 31 July and 6 August 2017.

Singles main-draw entrants

Seeds

 1 Rankings are as of 24 July 2017.

Other entrants
The following players received wildcards into the singles main draw:
  Marek Jaloviec
  Dominik Kellovský
  Patrik Rikl
  Tommy Robredo

The following players received entry from the qualifying draw:
  Hugo Dellien
  Juan Pablo Ficovich
  Roman Safiullin
  Robin Staněk

Champions

Singles

  Pedro Sousa def.  Guilherme Clezar 6–4, 5–7, 6–2.

Doubles

  Laurynas Grigelis /  Zdeněk Kolář def.  Tomasz Bednarek /  David Pel 6–3, 6–4.

References

2017 ATP Challenger Tour
2017
2017 in Czech sport
Sport in Liberec
July 2017 sports events in Europe
August 2017 sports events in Europe